The goggle-eyed worm snake (Leptotyphlops macrops) is a species of snakes in the family Leptotyphlopidae.

References

External Links
 iNaturalist page

Leptotyphlops
Reptiles described in 1996